The 1978 United States Senate special election in Minnesota was held on November 7, 1978. Democratic candidate Bob Short was defeated by Republican candidate David Durenberger.

Race Description 
In 1978, all three key statewide races in Minnesota were up for election—the governorship, and both Senate seats (the other Senate seat belonged to Wendell Anderson, who, as Governor of Minnesota, resigned his office in order to be appointed by his successor to fill the seat vacated by Walter Mondale, when Mondale ascended to the vice presidency in 1976). But, there was a particular oddity to the three races—all three had incumbents who were never elected to the office in the first place. This became a well played issue by the Republicans—a billboard put up across the state read, "The DFL is going to face something scary -- an election".

When Hubert H. Humphrey died in office in January 1978, sitting Governor Rudy Perpich appointed Humphrey's widow, Muriel to sit until a special election could be held later that year. However, Muriel Humphrey opted not to seek election to the seat in her own right, and the DFL nominated former Texas Rangers owner Bob Short to run in the subsequent special election. Short was rather conservative by DFL standards of the time, and his positions on hot button issues such as abortion, motorboat usage in the Boundary Waters Canoe area, and government spending gave more liberal DFLers pause.

The Independent-Republicans, for their part, nominated the liberal Republican David Durenberger, creating an unusual race in which the Independent-Republican candidate ran to the left of the DFL candidate. In addition to the general sense of dissatisfaction voters felt for the DFL, the party also had to contend with a large number of liberal DFLers crossing party lines to vote for Durenberger. As a result, Durenberger won in a 26.9-percent landslide as the governorship and both U.S. Senate seats switched into Republican hands.

The results in Minnesota marked the first time the GOP had held all three offices since Joseph H. Ball left the Senate in January 1949. Additionally, this election and the regular election both marked the first time since 1958 that both Senate seats in a state flipped from one party to the other in a single election cycle.

Democratic–Farmer–Labor primary

Candidates

Declared
 Sharon Anderson
 Donald M. Fraser, United States Representative from Minnesota's 5th congressional district
 Richard A. Palmer
 Bob Short, Businessman and former owner of the Texas Rangers

Results

Independent-Republican primary

Candidates

Declared
 Adell H. Campbell
 David Durenberger
 Will Lundquist
 Malcolm Moos, Former President of the University of Minnesota
 Ken Nordstrom

Results

American Party primary

Candidates

Declared
 Paul Helm

Results

Special election

Results

See also 
 1978 United States Senate elections

References 

1978
Minnesota
United States Senate
Minnesota 1978
Minnesota 1978
United States Senate 1978